In mathematics, Schur's inequality, named after Issai Schur,
establishes that for all non-negative real numbers
x, y, z and t,

with equality if and only if x = y = z or two of them are equal and the other is zero. When t is an even positive integer, the inequality holds for all real numbers x, y and z.

When , the following well-known special case can be derived:

Proof 
Since the inequality is symmetric in  we may assume without loss of generality that . Then the inequality

 

clearly holds, since every term on the left-hand side of the inequality is non-negative. This rearranges to Schur's inequality.

Extensions 
A generalization of Schur's inequality is the following:
Suppose a,b,c are positive real numbers. If the triples (a,b,c) and (x,y,z) are similarly sorted, then the following inequality holds:

In 2007, Romanian mathematician Valentin Vornicu showed that a yet further generalized form of Schur's inequality holds: 

Let , and let  be either convex or monotonic. Then,
 	
The standard form of Schur's is the case of this inequality where x = a, y = b, z = c, k = 1, ƒ(m) = mr.

Notes

Inequalities
Articles containing proofs